Telangana has multiple institutes of higher education universities along with numerous primary and secondary schools.

System of Telangana
The regional and official language of the Telangana is Telugu. Other linguistic groups in the  include speakers of Urdu and Hindi. Telangana Education is offered through a number of institutes spread across the state.  In Telangana the education system is of 10+2 system before joining under graduation. First standard to Tenth standard classes are conducted by the  School Education under the administration of the School Education Department and finally the Tenth Class (S.S.C.) Public examination at the state level is conducted by the Board of Secondary Education. After this two year Intermediate Education under the administration of the Board of Intermediate Education. The state would provide reservation in higher education to weaker sections of society on the pattern of Tamil Nadu, bypassing the 50% limit .

Schools 
The Telangana has a number of public and private schools and these are either affiliated to the Board of Secondary Education Telangana or Central Board of Secondary Education (CBSE), ICSE, IB, IGCSE. Government of Telangana is working towards building the excellent school system. Telangana is the 5th place for education passing percentage of 2018. Telangana has implemented various skill set in education system to make improvement on all the areas. 

The Telangana State Government established the Telangana Minorities Residential Educational Institutions Society in 2015 to provide residential education for children from minority populations.

Universities
Universities include:

Dr. B.R. Ambedkar Open University, Hyderabad
English and Foreign Languages University, Hyderabad
ICFAI Foundation for Higher Education, Hyderabad
Jawaharlal Nehru Architecture and Fine Arts University, Hyderabad
Jawaharlal Nehru Technological University, Hyderabad
Kakatiya University, Warangal
Kaloji Narayana Rao University of Health Sciences, Warangal
Mahatma Gandhi University, Nalgonda
Maulana Azad National Urdu University, Hyderabad
NALSAR University of Law, Hyderabad
Osmania University, Hyderabad
Palamuru University, Mahbubnagar
Potti Sriramulu Telugu University, Hyderabad
Professor Jayashankar Telangana State Agricultural University, Hyderabad
Rajiv Gandhi University of Knowledge Technologies, Adilabad
Satavahana University, Godavarikhani, Karimnagar
Sri Konda Laxman Telangana State Horticultural University, Hyderabad
Sri P.V. Narasimha Rao Telangana State University for Veterinary, Animal and Fishery Sciences, Hyderabad 
Symbiosis International (Deemed) University
Telangana University, Nizamabad
University of Hyderabad, Hyderabad

Institutes
Institutes include:

Birla Institute of Technology and Science, Hyderabad
Indian Institute of Technology, Hyderabad
International Institute of Information Technology, Hyderabad
Indian School of Business, Hyderabad
National Institute of Fashion Technology, Hyderabad
National Institute of Technology, Warangal
Nizam's Institute of Medical Sciences, Hyderabad
School of Planning and Architecture, Hyderabad

Research Institutes
Research Institutes include:

CR Rao Advanced Institute of Mathematics, Statistics and Computer Science, Hyderabad
Electronics Corporation of India Limited, Hyderabad
National Institute of Animal Biotechnology, Hyderabad
National Institute of Rural Development, Hyderabad
NIPER Hyderabad
Tata Institute of Fundamental Research, Hyderabad
Tata Institute of Social Sciences, Hyderabad
Indian National Centre for Ocean Information Services, Hyderabad

See also
 Dreams Choked (documentary film)

References

Venugopal